Krontjong may refer to:
Kroncong (Dutch: Krontjong), a ukulele-like Indonesian instrument and musical style
Javindo language, also known by the pejorative name Krontjong, a Dutch-based creole language formerly spoken in Java, Indonesia